Norquist is a surname. Notable people with the surname include:

 Gerry Norquist (born 1962), American golfer
 Grover Norquist (born 1956), president of anti-tax lobbying group Americans for Tax Reform
 John Norquist (born 1949), mayor of Milwaukee, Wisconsin from 1988 through 2003

See also 
 Nordquist (surname)